John Dennis Liu (born 1953 in Nashville, Tennessee) is a Chinese American film-maker and ecologist. He is also a researcher at several institutions. In January 2015 John was named Visiting Fellow at Netherlands Institute of Ecology (NIOO) of the Royal Netherlands Academy of Arts and Sciences. John is also Ecosystem Ambassador for the Commonland Foundation based in Amsterdam, Netherlands. In 2017 John Liu founded Ecosystem Restoration Camps, a worldwide movement that aims to restore damaged ecosystems on a large scale.

Career

Early career
Liu was born in Nashville, Tennessee, United States, as the son of a Chinese father and American mother. He  spent most of his youth in Bloomington, Indiana. Liu studied journalism. In 1979 he went for the first time to China, after being pushed by his father to see his grandmother before her death. In China Liu helped set up the CBS News bureau in Beijing in 1981, at a time when tensions between the United States and China were lessening. He worked for CBS for more than ten years as a producer and cameraman. Liu has said that after the collapse of the Soviet Union he grew tired of journalism and wished to make films. He started working for European media as RAI, SRG SSR, ZDF For RAI, ZDF, BBC World and National Geographic Channel he produced nature documentaries. In 1995 he filmed the Loess Plateau in China, which was being transformed from a barren and eroded ground into an oasis by the government. At this point Liu noticed the possibility of humans restoring ecosystems, rather than only destroying them.

Ecological recovery and ideas
Liu retired from journalism in 1997 and became the director of the Environmental Education Media Project (EEMP). With the EEMP he uses television to provide information about ecology, sustainable development, public health in China and other countries. Liu emphasizes that the harmful effect of humans on the world is not only caused by greenhouse gasses, but is to a great extent caused by the destruction of biomass, organic matter and biodiversity. Liu claims that the decline in these factors has led to higher temperatures and loss of arable soil, in the end leading to desertification. Liu sees a solution for these problems in the way people look at money, as people currently value the products and services derived from ecosystems higher than the ecosystems themselves. The episode, Regreening the desert / Green gold of the show Tegenlicht, was aired by Dutch public broadcaster VPRO and co-produced by Liu. The episodes sees Liu traveling the world to countries as Jordan, China and Ethiopia and shows the possibilities in re-greening areas turning into desert. At the 65th Prix Italia, in September 2013, the episode won the Special Prize Expo 2015. Since 2009, Liu is working together with Willem Ferwerda, former director of the Dutch office of IUCN,   executive fellow business and ecosystems at the Rotterdam School of Management, Erasmus University, and founder of the Commonland Foundation an organization that works on large scale landscape restoration projects with a business approach, based on the 4 returns from landscape restoration framework developed by Ferwerda. John Liu founded Ecosystem Restoration Camps in 2017, a worldwide movement that aims to restore damaged ecosystems on a large scale.

Research
Liu was named Rothamstead International Fellow for the Communication of Science at Rothamsted Research, an agricultural research institution. He also was an associate professor at the George Mason University as a part of the Center for Climate and Society, and a senior research fellow at the International Union for Conservation of Nature. In January 2015 John was named Visiting Fellow at Netherlands Institute of Ecology (NIOO) of the Royal Netherlands Academy of Arts and Sciences. John is also Ecosystem Ambassador for the Commonland foundation based in Amsterdam, Netherlands.

Writings
Liu has written for publications all over the world on a variety of topics, but he most consistently writes on the potential for the restoration of large-scale damaged ecosystems.  He has written on ecosystem restoration for Kosmos magazine  as well as for The Christian Science Monitor and for Forum for the Future in their Green Futures magazine.  He has also written about the spiritual side of ecology and ecosystem restoration.

Hope in a Changing Climate
Hope in a Changing Climate was first screened in Copenhagen at COP 15 and on BBC World. Since its launch, Hope has been translated into French, German, Chinese, Vietnamese, Polish, Russian and Spanish. The film was officially chosen to commemorate the United Nations International Year of Forests, 2011. It was the most viewed video on the WaterChannel for more than 12 months in 2010 and 2011.

Hope won the Best Documentary Short Film Award at Green Screen in Vancouver, Canada, 2011. The International Festival of Environmental Film and Video accepted the film into its highly competitive global festival, June 2010. Hope was entered into United States: Best in Category: Ecosystem award in the prestigious International Wildlife Film Festival in Montana. In addition to the award for best ecosystem film, Hope also received six merit awards from IWWF (Presenter, Storytelling, Scientific Content, Conservation Initiative, Conservation Message and Human-Environment) in its 33rd annual film festival, May 2010, in Missoula, Montana;

Green Gold

In conjunction with Dutch public broadcasting company VPRO, and the program Backlight, the film followed Liu as he traverses the globe documenting and inspiring large-scale projects from China, Ethiopia, and Rwanda. Green Gold uses some footage from Hope In a Changing Climate but it increases the depth of the film with a trip to Jordan, at the invitation of Princess Basma bint Talal, where he works with well-known permaculture designer Geoff Lawton at the Permaculture Research Institute of Jordan.  In addition to Princess Talal and the Lawtons' thoughts (and projects), the documentary also features more of Liu's reflections on the regions he has visited. (Also known as "Regreening the Desert" available as a streaming video from Films on Demand by Films Media Group, at subscribing institutions.)

Filmography

 Jane Goodall - China Diary (2003), wrote, produced and directed
 Hope in a Changing Climate (2009), presented
 Lessons of the Loess Plateau wrote, produced and directed
 Scaling Up Poverty Reduction in China  
 Beating the Drum Loudly
 A Line in the Sand
 Because They're Worth It
 The Long March
 Women of the Gobi
 Forests of Hope
 Forests Keep Drylands Working
 Food Security and Environmental Transformation in Ethiopia
 Emerging in a Changing Climate
 A Steppe Ahead
 The Next Steppe in Mongolia's Energy Future
 Leading With Agriculture

See also
Geoff Lawton

References

External links
https://knaw.academia.edu/JohnDLiu
https://nioo.knaw.nl/en/news/watch-john-d-lius-nioo-seminar
 Environmental Education Media Project (EEMP)
Permaculture Research Institute of Jordan
John D. Liu at EEMP
http://www.commonland.com/

https://www.ecosystemrestorationcamps.org/foundation/john-d-liu/

1953 births
Living people
American journalists of Chinese descent
American documentary filmmakers
Chinese documentary filmmakers
American ecologists
People from Nashville, Tennessee
George Mason University faculty
People involved with desert greening
Permaculturalists
Rothamsted Experimental Station people
Academic staff of Vrije Universiteit Amsterdam